"What'll We Do With Ragland Park?" is a science fiction short story by American writer Philip K. Dick. It was first published in Amazing Stories magazine in 1963.

The story is a sequel to "Stand-By", a variation on the classic theme of the prophecy that always comes true. The original manuscript title was "No Ordinary Guy".

References

External links
 

Short stories by Philip K. Dick
1963 short stories
Works originally published in Amazing Stories